Samsung Jet (S8000) is a mid-range touchscreen mobile phone released in June 2009 by Samsung Mobile. It is styled just like the Samsung i8000 Omnia II, but is smaller in size and runs a proprietary Samsung interface. Like the Omnia II (announced at the same time), the Samsung Jet featured an 800 MHz processor, which was faster than most smartphones of the time.

Specifications

 Display: PenTile AMOLED
 Resolution: 16M-color resistive touchscreen of 800 × 480 pixel resolution
 Screen Size: 
 Weight: 
 Dimensions: 
 Talk Time: 8 hours 20 minutes (2G), 5 hours (3G)
 Standby Time: 422 hours (2G), 406 hours (3G)
 Connectivity: HSDPA, Wi-Fi and Bluetooth (A2DP)

Features
The phone features an 800 MHz processor, a 5 MP camera with 480p video recorder, a 3.1-inch resistive touchscreen AMOLED display, A-GPS, FM radio, 2 or 8 GB of internal storage with a microSD slot for an additional 16 GB and a Samsung-developed WebKit-touting web browser. It runs Samsung's TouchWiz 2.0 interface. The videos recorded are at a D1 resolution at 30 fps using a low bitrate 3GP format.

Android compatibility
A group of developers (with some of the Darkforest forum) have managed to run Android on this phone under the project name of JetDroid. However, messaging and calls do not work for now.

External links
Samsung S8000 Jet Official Page
Samsung S8000 Jet - Full phone specifications
Samsung S8000 Jet Users Group
Samsung Jet specs and download page
JetDroid Development Forums

References

s-8000
Mobile phones introduced in 2009